Spain participated in the Eurovision Song Contest 2022 in Turin, Italy, with the song "SloMo" performed by Chanel earning a third position. The Spanish broadcaster  (RTVE), together with the Generalitat Valenciana, organised Benidorm Fest in order to select the Spanish entry for the 2022 contest. Benidorm Fest consisted of two semi-finals on 26 and 27 January and the final on 29 January 2022. A total of thirteen artists and songs competed, and the winner was determined by a combination of votes from an expert jury, a demoscopic panel and a televote.

As part of the "Big Five", Spain directly qualified to compete in the final of the Eurovision Song Contest. Performing during the show in position 10, "SloMo" eventually finished in third place with 459 points. Chanel became the highest scoring Spanish Eurovision entrant and scored Spain its best result since 1995.

Background 

In , Spain placed twenty-fourth with the song "" performed by Blas Cantó.

The Spanish national broadcaster,  (TVE), broadcasts the event within Spain and organises the selection process for the nation's entry. TVE confirmed their intentions to participate at the 2022 Eurovision Song Contest on 3 June 2021. In 2021, TVE selected the artist that would compete at the Eurovision Song Contest via an internal selection, while the song was selected via a national final.

Before Eurovision

Benidorm Fest 2022 

Thirteen (originally fourteen) artists and songs competed over three shows: two semi-finals on 26 and 27 January 2022 and the final on 29 January 2022. The  invested around €968,000 in the event.

The semi-finals were broadcast on two consecutive nights of the same week, and the voting consisted of voting system consisted the televote (50%), a demoscopic panel of judges made up of a sample of the Spanish population selected by statistical and demoscopic criteria (25%), and a national and international jury vote (50%).

Semi-finals 

 The first semi-final took place on 26 January 2022, with six acts taking part. Luna Ki, who was set to compete with "", had withdrawn from the competition due to a combination of personal issues and the inability to use autotune under Eurovision rules.
 The second semi-final took place on 27 January 2022, with seven acts taking part. "" performed by Rigoberta Bandini, "" performed by Rayden, "" performed by Xeinn and "" performed by Gonzalo Hermida advanced to the final, while "" performed by Marta Sango, "Culpa" performed by Javiera Mena and "Make You Say" performed by Sara Deop were eliminated.

Final 
The final took place on 29 January 2022 and consisted of the eight entries that qualified from the two preceding semi-finals.

Preparations and promotion 

The stage director for the Spanish performance was Kyle Hanagami. Chanel was accompanied on stage by five dancers: Exon Arcos, Josh Huerta, Pol Soto, Raquel Caurín and Ría Pérez.

A music video for "SloMo" premiered on the official YouTube channel of the Eurovision Song Contest on 15 March 2022. Prior to the contest, Chanel made appearances across Europe to specifically promote "SloMo" as the Spanish Eurovision entry. She first performed at the Barcelona Eurovision Party, which was held on 26 March 2022 at Barcelona's Sala Apolo, and later performed at the London Eurovision Party, which was held on 3 April 2022 at London's Hard Rock Hotel venue. She also performed in the Eurovision in Concert at Amsterdam's AFAS Live on 9 April, and the PrePartyES which took place in Madrid's Sala La Riviera on 16 April.

Send-off ceremony 
On 27 April, RTVE prepared a farewell ceremony for the Spanish representative to the Eurovision Song Contest 2022. The ceremony was organized in the Cines Callao in Madrid. Prior to the event, a live stream on RTVE Play followed a press conference hosted by the Director of Communication and Participation of RTVE, María Eizaguirre, in which Chanel shared her final thoughts before making the trip to Turin with fans and journalists. She was joined by the Spanish Head of Delegation, Eva Mora; the spokesperson of the Spanish jury for Eurovision 2022, Nieves Álvarez; and the Spanish Eurovision commentators, Julia Varela and Tony Aguilar. Tickets for the event were sold the day before at Torrespaña (Calle Alcalde Sáinz de Baranda, 92): two individual tickets were given to each person who attended.

At Eurovision 
According to Eurovision rules, all nations with the exceptions of the host country and the "Big Five" (France, Germany, Italy, Spain and the United Kingdom) are required to qualify from one of two semi-finals in order to compete for the final; the top ten countries from each semi-final progress to the final. As a member of the "Big Five", Spain automatically qualified to compete in the final on 14 May 2022. Spain was set to perform in the first half of the final. In addition to its participation in the final, Spain was also required to broadcast and vote in one of the two semi-finals. This was decided via a draw held during the semi-final allocation draw on 25 January 2022, when it was announced that Spain would be voting in the second semi-final.

In addition, the final was screened live in cinemas across the country due to an agreement with cinema chain Cinesa. The Spanish spokesperson, who announced the top 12-point score awarded by the Spanish jury during the final, was Nieves Álvarez.

Voting 
Voting during the three shows involved each country awarding two sets of points from 1-8, 10 and 12: one from their professional jury and the other from televoting. Each nation's jury consisted of five music industry professionals who are citizens of the country they represent, with a diversity in gender and age represented. The judges assess each entry based on the performances during the second Dress Rehearsal of each show, which takes place the night before each live show, against a set of criteria including: vocal capacity; the stage performance; the song's composition and originality; and the overall impression by the act. Jury members may only take part in panel once every three years, and are obliged to confirm that they are not connected to any of the participating acts in a way that would impact their ability to vote impartially. Jury members should also vote independently, with no discussion of their vote permitted with other jury members. The exact composition of the professional jury, and the results of each country's jury and televoting were released after the grand final; the individual results from each jury member were also released in an anonymised form.

Below is a breakdown of points awarded to Spain and awarded by Spain in the second semi-final and grand final of the contest, and the breakdown of the jury voting and televoting conducted during the two shows:

Points awarded to Spain

Points awarded by Spain

Detailed voting results 
The following members comprised the Spanish jury:
 Blanca Paloma – scenographer, singer, finalist at Benidorm Fest 2022, future representative of Spain at Eurovision Song Contest 2023
  – singer, songwriter, vocal coach
 Kai Etxaniz – singer, songwriter
 Pilar Tabares – television director
 Verónica Ferreiro – singer, songwriter

After Eurovision 
Spain received at least one point from every country in the Eurovision Song Contest except for Italy. For the first time in its participation history, Spain received the most sets of twelve points from the national juries, tied with the United Kingdom with eight sets of maximum points. The long-awaited success of Spain in the Eurovision Song Contest 2022 was greeted with enthusiasm across Spain, with deputy prime ministers Nadia Calviño and Yolanda Díaz and opposition leader Alberto Núñez Feijóo among others congratulating Chanel for her performance and result. An average of 6.8 million viewers watched the final, with a peak of 8.853 million during the voting sequence. This equaled a 50.8% share of the market over the four hours of the final, an increase of 21.4 points from the previous edition. On 15 May, the day after the final, a reception event was organized at the Plaza Mayor in Madrid, where Chanel was greeted by a full crowd. On 17 May, Chanel received a congratulation letter from King Felipe VI and Queen Letizia of Spain.

Notes

References

External links
 Official TVE Eurovision website

2022
Countries in the Eurovision Song Contest 2022
Eurovision
Eurovision